Jean-Marie Seroney (25 July 1927 – 6 December 1982) was a Kenyan human rights advocate, a legislator, and an Amnesty International prisoner of conscience. He was detained as a prisoner of conscience for 1,155 days.

Seroney served as the Member of the Legislative Council for Nandi Constituency from 1961 to 1963 and Member of Parliament (MP) for Nandi North from 1963 to 1966 before becoming the Member for the newly formed Tinderet Constituency from 1966 to 1975. As a legislator, he worked hard to introduce bills that would remove or at least check the excessive powers vested in the president as a result of the numerous amendments to the Constitution. He also brought in the first private member's bill to help ensure that Kenya's elections were free, fair and inclusive.

In his life, Seroney decried what he described as the wanton abuse of power by the executive and condemned corruption, the unfair distribution of national wealth, theft of land from the poor by the ruling elite, and the failure to resettle the landless. He made powerful enemies, and his detention in harsh prison conditions for three and a half years set in motion the events that eventually led to his death.

Early life
Jean-Marie Seroney was born Eric Kipketer Seroney on Monday, 25 July 1927 at Kapsabet, Nandi District of Kenya. He was the first child of the recently converted Africa Inland Mission (AIM) teacher/evangelist Reuben Seroney and Leah Jeptarus Tapmaina Seroney. Shortly after his birth, the Rev. Stuart M. Bryson took over the Kapsabet AIM Mission.. Bryson turned out to be a controversial missionary challenging the deeply held traditions of the Nandi in a bid to increase his numbers. He immediately sent Reuben Seroney to start a new Mission station and school at Surungai some 32 miles north of the Kapsabet Mission. Reuben and Leah taught at the Surungai School in the afternoons and spent their mornings preaching in the nearby villages. Two years later, in 1929, Leah unexpectedly died from labour complications. Two years later Reuben married Rebecca Jeptanui.

The Seroney family lived in the Surungai Mission until 1933 when Reuben was asked to move to Kapsowar in Elgeyo-Marakwet area to pioneer the new Mission station together with Rev. and Mrs. R. V. Reynolds. The AIM had also started a hospital there which stands to date. Reuben Seroney stayed at Kapsowar as an evangelist and the lead teacher of the school for five years. He visited nearby villages and far-off areas teaching and preaching. It was during one of his visits to Kabartonjo in Tugen country that Reuben Seroney met Daniel Toroitich arap Moi, later to become President of Kenya. He became Moi's teacher and mentor and was instrumental in placing him at Government African School Kapsabet in 1938.

Education
The young Seroney began formal schooling in 1935 at Kapsowar with his father and Mrs. Reynolds as his instructors. Following his father's return to Kapsabet in May 1938, he joined the Government African School at Kapsabet (now Kapsabet High School) from 1938 to 1940. Seroney passed his Primary School Examination and was the only one in his class to be admitted to the Alliance High School in Kikuyu which was then Kenya's only secondary school. He obtained a scholarship from the Local Native Council (LNC) at Kapsabet which paid for him the required Sh. 200 annual fee. Seroney stayed at Alliance from 1941 to 1944, where he studied under Edward Carey Francis.

He sat for the Cambridge School Certificate and obtained a Division 1, which meant he could then proceed to Makerere for higher studies. He enrolled at the Makerere College in Kampala, Uganda in 1945 taking the Higher Studies in Arts. At Makerere, he won the prestigious Arts Research Prize. He was the founding President of the Political Society and served as the president of the Dramatic Society in the final year. After performing well at Makerere, he got the Government of India Scholarship to study at the prestigious University of Allahabad in the state of Uttar Pradesh, India. He began his studies there in September 1947 at the William Holland University College, a constituent college of the University of Allahabad. He completed his BA degree in 1949 obtaining a Second-class Honours, Upper Division. He began to study for his LL.B degree at the same university and completed in December 1951 and obtained a first-class honours. He became the first Kenyan to hold a law degree.

Religion
In 1938, Reuben Seroney had a serious misunderstanding with outgoing missionary Stuart M. Bryson and his replacement Reginald V. Reynolds. Bryson was one of the most significant AIM missionaries to the Nandi people (a sub-tribe of the Kalenjin People) and helped translate the Bible into the Nandi language with Rev. Samuel Gimnyigei). Reuben Seroney disagreed with them over Nandi cultural practices that the AIM church continued to strongly oppose as well as the failure of the organization to grant him pastoral authority. He left the AIM and joined the Native Anglican Church (later changing its name to the African Anglican Church). It was formed by the Church Missionary Society (CMS) and which is the forerunner of the Anglican Church of Kenya today. Reuben Seroney moved shortly after his return from Kapsowar in 1939.

Reuben Seroney was then licensed to become an evangelist/teacher by the African Church Council of the 'Native Anglican Church' on 29 November 1942. He rose to become the first Vicar of Nandi in 1950 but died in a road accident on 12 April 1954. He was survived by his wife Rebecca and their twelve children, Jean-Marie, Grace, David, Walter, Graham, Richard, Jean, Agnes, Christine, Tom, Eunice and Levi.

Becoming Catholic
The young Eric Seroney was baptized an Anglican in 1944 but also fell out with his own father in the matter of religion while attending Makerere College in 1946 where he became a Roman Catholic. It was from his conversion to the Catholic faith that he changed his name to John Marie Therese out of his devotion to St. Marie Therese of Liseux. He later Francized and hyphenated the name to Jean-Marie Seroney, dropping the active use of ‘Therese’. He remained a practicing Catholic the remainder of his life devoted to St. Therese, even choosing to remain celibate. His decision to become a Catholic did not go down well with his father Reuben, who took to task Fr. Joseph Kuhn of the Chepterit Catholic Mission for baptizing his son in 1947.

Political activities
While in India Jean-Marie Seroney had kept the political pressure on the colonial government by various methods, even publishing an article in the Indian Review of January 1950 entitled 'Threat of South African Fascism to East Africa.' He returned to Kenya in 1951, just in time for the heady days of the independence struggle before the declaration of the Mau Mau Emergency. He addressed public meetings in the African quarter in Nairobi and once accompanied Jomo Kenyatta on a tour of the Rift Valley.

The colonial administration in Kenya was impressed with his political activities and so it was felt that he should proceed to England for further studies. In February 1952, he was offered a loan by the Administration and in July 1952 he was admitted to the University College of the South-West of England at Exeter (now the University of Exeter) where he would study for an Intermediate LL.B of the University of London and at the same time study for the Bar at the Inner Temple London. Shortly before he went to Exeter, he attended and addressed the World Assembly for Moral Re-Armament in Caux, Switzerland in August 1952 and called for a new way of dealing with the issue of colonialism.

After differences with university authorities at Exeter over what he considered a repetition of his degree at India, he opted to go straight for the Bar instead of going through with the intermediate LLB. After much struggle with the colonial authorities both in England and in Kenya, he eventually sat for his Bar finals in December 1955, and on 7 February 1956 he was admitted to the Bar of England by the Honorable Society of the Inner Temple. He made history as only the third Kenyan to become a barrister after Chiedo More Gem Argwings-Kodhek and Charles Njonjo, and the first to also hold a law degree. He returned to Kenya fully qualified to practice law as a barrister before Her Majesty's High Courts.

Employment and entry into politics
On his return to Kenya in 1956, Seroney was appointed as a legal assistant in the office of the Registrar-General's on 21 June 1956. In December 1957, he was promoted to the position of public prosecutor in charge of bankruptcy offences through a Kenya Gazette notice no. 4067 dated 3 December 1957.

On 25 September 1958, he applied to be admitted as a member of the Law Society of Kenya which had just been formed in 1948. Seroney had made history as the second black Kenyan African to qualify in law after the late Chiedo More Gem Argwings-Kodhek. At the time of his application in 1958 the Hon. Justice Chanan Singh was the Chairman of the Law Society of Kenya. When he was accepted to the Bar of Kenya he immediately resigned and went into private practice.

Seroney continued with covert political activities at the height of Kenya's emergency period in the fifties engaging with many of the early politicians such as Tom Mboya, Oginga Odinga, Dr. Julius Kiano and many others. He even joined Mboya's Airlift program and is known to have helped some Nandi youth to go to America to obtain a higher education. He also joined the Labour movement and became the secretary-general of the Kenya African Civil Servants Union. He gave legal advice and supported the Independence movement in many ways.

It was not until 1959 that Seroney finally ventured into politics proper when he called for the formation of a political party that took the interests of the Africans at heart. The following year he announced his intention to vie for the Nandi open seat at the Legislative Council (LEGCO) on Sunday 27 November 1960. In February 1961, at the age of 33, he was elected to the Legislative Council as Member for Nandi, beating his sole rival Shadrack Kimalel. Seroney was appointed Parliamentary Secretary in the Ministry of Defence.

On 13 February 1962 he was in the Kenyan Delegation to the Lancaster House Conference and the final Independence talks in September 1963. In 1963 he was elected Member of Parliament for Nandi North Constituency on a Kenya African Democratic Union ticket and also took his seat in the regional assembly that met in Nakuru. He crossed the floor, however, and joined the Kenya African National Union together with Taita araap Towett the MP for Bureti and William Murgor the MP for Elgeyo on 21 November 1963. This rubbed many the wrong way especially his friend-turned-foe Daniel arap Moi who had remained in KADU. On 27 November 1963 he invited Prime Minister Jomo Kenyatta to address a public rally in Kapsabet and Eldoret.

He was elected MP for Tinderet in 1966 and served until the elections held in 1969. In the 1969 general elections, he beat his closest rival Francis K. Ruto to win with 9,006 votes against Ruto's 1,699 to reclaim his Tinderet seat.

The Nandi Hills Declaration
Seroney got in trouble in September 1969 when he presented the controversial "Nandi Hills Declaration", a document authored by his friend Joseph K. Mitei from Koilot, Ol'Lessos of Nandi District. Mitei was the Organizing Secretary of ruling party KANU, Nandi branch when he wrote the document on 27 July 1969. The document challenged the Kenyatta administration's sale/settlement of Nandi land to non-Kalenjin settlers at the expense of former owners of that land while the other half was a protest on police brutality and the unfair judicial system in Nandi.

The document was deemed seditious and Seroney was arrested on Saturday, 20 September 1969 at Eldoret and transported to Nakuru with his friend Mitei and on Tuesday 23 September charged with sedition in a Nakuru court. The defence was led by P.J. Wilkinson QC, a former Attorney General of Uganda assisted by Sibi-Okumu. They were convicted and fined KShs. 6,000 each by Resident Magistrate R.P. Maini.

Fallout with Moi
By now Seroney was not popular with establishment figures especially Daniel Moi who had been appointed as the vice-president as he seemed to undermine Moi's authority as the sole spokesman of the Kalenjin. He was however quite popular on the ground, much more popular than Moi, who was vice-president. Moi was perceived by the Kalenjin as having watched as their lands were being grabbed by powerful figures in Kenyatta's Government. Moi's appointment as vice-president was seen as a way to placate the Kalenjin in order to settle their lands without a question. Moi and Seroney's differences took a turn when the latter decided to establish the Samoei Institute for Technology and Education in Nandi Hills. Moi instead used state machinations to downgrade the registered institute to a 'harambee' (self-help) secondary school much to the dismay of the people of Nandi. Moi used his control of the provincial administration to ensure that Seroney did not get permits to hold rallies or collect funds for the institute and in the end, the institute was 'deregistered'. Despite motions in Parliament and press battles, Moi in the end proved the stronger of the two.

Some strong political forces in the Rift Valley started to gang up against Seroney ahead of the 1974 general election held on 14 October. Most notable was the then Councillor Ezekiel Barngetuny who was Moi's closest confidant in Nandi. Despite strong opposition, Seroney retained his seat against Moi's preferred candidates. Realizing that Seroney's differences with Moi were widening, former Uasin Gishu politician Paul Kiplimo Boit, approached Seroney and took him to Moi at Kabarak in a bid to have them bury the hatchet. Seroney met with Moi on 17 November 1974 to iron out their differences - partly for the sake of development and partly to obtain Moi's support ahead of Seroney's bid for the seat of Deputy Speaker that was about to take place.

His truce with Moi was short-lived as they resumed their rivalry almost immediately.

Deputy Speaker
After his victory at the polls, Seroney was determined to add a feather in his cap by going for the seat of Deputy Speaker of the National Assembly. He won the seat despite vigorous opposition by no less than President Jomo Kenyatta who uncharacteristically adjourned Parliament for three months in a bid to prevent Seroney from being elected Deputy Speaker. When Parliament resumed on 5 February 1975 Seroney was elected as the Deputy Speaker.

Things came to a head after the murder of Nyandarua North Member of Parliament and vocal Government critic Josiah Mwangi Kariuki in March 1975. Seroney sat in the Committee formed to probe the death of Kariuki as its secretary and wrote a damning report accusing Government of being behind his death and for trying to cover it up.

Detention without trial
On 9 October 1975, Jean-Marie Seroney got in trouble again when as Deputy Speaker of Parliament after he refused to ask Martin Shikuku MP for Butere to substantiate his remark that "Kanu was dead". He replied to Kihika Kimani who had sought a substantiation of the remarks of Shikuku that "why substantiate the obvious...". This remark. led to his detention on 15 October 1975 at his office in Parliament at 7:15 pm.

Earlier that day he had sparked heated and bitter debate when he sought the Speaker's ruling on his security after getting wind that policemen were waiting to pick him and Shikuku up. He chaired the afternoon session until 6:30 pm and was picked up as he left his office. He was taken to Manyani Prison where he served in detention without trial for the next three years, losing his parliamentary seat in the process.

Shortly, human rights organizations such as Amnesty International as well as the Inter-Parliamentary Union took up his case with the Government of Kenya.

Seroney never spoke of his days behind bars. However, those who visited him there said he took it stoically. He suffered terrible withdrawal symptoms from his addiction to tobacco but soon became stable. He minded his family while behind bars but his finances were seriously taking a beating. Naturally the farms performed poorly and he was unable to pay the school fees for his dependants as well as the rent for their home. He lived in Nairobi's South 'B' area in a City Council house.

Seroney was released from detention through a presidential pardon on 12 December 1978. He was released with 25 other prisoners, most of whom were prisoners of conscience. Among them were Ngũgĩ wa Thiong'o, Koigi wa Wamwere, George Anyona, Martin Shikuku, Wasonga Sijeyo, and others. Seroney had spent 1,155 days (three years, two months) in detention without trial, becoming one of Kenya's longest prisoners of conscience.

Elections of 1979
In January 1979, just 3 weeks after his release from detention, he was invited together with a large delegation from his Tinderet Constituency to Moi's home at Kabarak on 1 January 1979 ostensibly to begin a new year with new things. During the meeting, President Moi praised Seroney as a good leader and played down their differences, pledging to work with him. He reportedly said that if there were only a few others like Seroney, this nation would be very different. The truce was to last only a few days.

Just a week later, another delegation led by Ezekiel Barng'etuny went to Kabarak this time taking a young middle management employee of the Kenya Breweries named Henry Kiprono Kosgey. He was introduced to the gathering of Tinderet constituents at Kabarak as the man for the upcoming elections of 1979. The indefatigable efforts of Ezekiel Barngetuny (who also went on to introduce Samuel Ngeny to beat Simeon Kiptum Choge and Stanley Metto to remove Robert Tanui in Mosop through his famous slogan 'Kibunguok Somok' or 'Three Keys') The election symbol for Kosgey, Ngeny and Metto was the Key which was partially to spite Seroney for having 'locked' away or closed development in Nandi. Barngetuny and others led to the electoral defeat of Seroney on 8 November 1979. All his three 'keys' went in but not without serious illegularities, violence and open rigging.

Seroney conceded defeat, pledging to work with the new MP, citing "grave irregularities during the election campaign and on the polling day..."

Violence against Seroney
Seroney had been physically harassed, beaten and even denied permits to hold public rallies and where he did, they were disrupted. It was clear that someone desperately didn't want him to go back to Parliament. According to Peter Sang, an Eldoret businessman and supporter of Seroney, there was a deliberate scheme to rig out Seroney right from the start. He narrated a story told to him by H. K. Burrows the proprietor of Ogirgir Tea estate who found a mob of rowdy youth that had captured Seroney, roughed him up, spat on him all over, soiled him and mocked him in public as he was on the campaign trail.

Burrows intervened and had Seroney released by the mob. Seroney's supporter John Rugut a colleague of Sang at the Kibwari Tea Estate who witnessed this ordeal. Rugut says he found a dejected Seroney on the scene and helped calm the mob. He whisked Seroney to the safety of his car together with Burrows and drove him off to safety. It is clear that if they had not done that, Seroney might have been killed. It was soon clear that his re-election efforts were futile. He lost by an unreasonably huge margin. It was not probable, but it happened. On 16 November 1979 he issued a press statement pledging to work with the new MP and pledging his loyalty to President Moi.

Investment and destitution 
In 1975, Seroney purchased 1,546 acres of former Kapkures Sisal Estates in his Tinderet Constituency. He renamed it 'Kibois Farm' which was in turn owned by the Kaprotuk Estates Ltd of which he was a majority shareholder. He took a loan of KSh 1,035,000 from the Standard Chartered Bank and the National Bank of Kenya to finance the acquisition.

By 15 May 1980 he owed a whopping KShs. 1,545,012.15 (adjusted to 2018 approximately Kshs. 1 billion, or US$10 million). His farming deteriorated significantly and Seroney was unable to service his huge loan. He faced imminent foreclosure and desperately tried to seek the help of the Government to at least waive off his interest for the time he was in detention now that he had not been tried and found guilty of any offence. His pleas fell on deaf ears leading him deep into a state of depression, turning him deep into alcoholism.

In 1980, in an tokenistic gesture, Moi appointed Seroney as the Chairman of the Industrial Development Bank of Kenya (IDB) which was not a paid position and was merely a ceremonial head. He worked with Dr. Julius Gikonyo Kiano his longtime friend and onetime Member of Parliament and Cabinet Minister. The Minister for Industry which the IDB came under was Andrew Omanga. Seroney's office at the IDB headquarters along Harambee Avenue Nairobi where the offices remain to date. Although the appointment was of little benefit to him financially, it helped put him in the limelight at least for the duration until his death while in office two years later. Constant financial worries and deeper fears of his own failings drove him to a state of depression and he withdrew from the public only limiting his brief appearance in the Press to official matters.

Death and controversy
On the afternoon of Tuesday, 30 November 1982 Seroney was admitted at MP Shah Hospital in Nairobi complaining of chest pains. He had been unwell for a number of days, avoiding going to hospital. His secretary then called a doctor who took him to hospital from his house in Mariakani (South B) Nairobi. He spent 5 days in the general ward and was due to be discharged on Friday of that week. However, his condition took a sudden turn for the worse shortly after a visit by some of his most ardent opponents. He was taken to ICU on Saturday where was put under further treatment when his condition worsened. On Monday 6 December at 6:45 am Hon. Jean- Marie Seroney died. His personal doctor Dr. Nalini P. Mandevia said that he died of "hepatitis failure, jaundice and anemia"

Questions arose immediately about his death and many people could not believe the cause of death as stated. Curiously, no post-mortem was done.

President Moi sent a message of condolence to his family stating that he had learned with "deep sorrow" of the untimely death of Seroney. He died just 6 days shy of the fourth anniversary of his release. His funeral was held on 13 December 1982 in a ceremony that was attended by President Moi and thousands of his friends and constituents at Ko'lelach Village, Senetwo Village, Meteitei, Tinderet. This was the fourth anniversary of his release. However, the farm where he was buried was later sold by the bank to recover the 1975 loan. His former house is now a school and his grave is a part of the playground.

Legacy
Seroney is a hero of Kenya's independence for which he worked for tirelessly from as early as 1950. When he returned from India in 1951 he joined KAU and popularized it with a tour of the Rift Valley with Jomo Kenyatta before Kenyatta was detained the following year. Through his close friendship with Tom Mboya he helped organize the famous 'Air Lifts' that sent many Kenyan's to universities in the United States starting from the late fifties. He also offered valuable legal advice to Tom Mboya during the pre-independence period and also helped many Mau Mau victims find legal help. As a member of the Legislative Council and the National Assembly, he worked tirelessly to repeal repressive Colonial-era laws such as the Chief's Authority Act, Public Order Act, Laibon Removal Ordinance, Trespass Act and many more.

Seroney helped champion social justice, the rule of law and democracy through much of the early independence years of Kenya. His ideas of Devolution which he kept active through much of the sixties and seventies are now part of the Constitution of Kenya(2010). In 1969 Seroney is on record as having called for the release from detention of Oginga Odinga following his detention after the Kisumu riots. He called for the Government to clear Odinga and members of his Party the Kenya People's Union before the elections and to end the practice of detention without trial. He vigorously opposed attempts to make Kenya a single-party state strongly rooting for pluralism and political tolerance as well as national cohesion with the presence of an active parliamentary opposition to check government. He championed press freedom famously calling for a 'free, frank and fearless' press in Kenya. The statement was until recently been used by the Kenyan newspaper the 'People Daily' as its slogan.

Seroney also became the first private individual to sponsor a bill which he drafted single-handedly to try and rectify the problems associated with the Kenyan elections. After much opposition, his bill was taken over by the Attorney General Charles Njonjo and modified to make Seroney's sweeping changes more tame and then labeled a government bill. It was later discarded anyway leading to serious problems that continue to affect Kenya's elections. Seroney vigorously fought against Corruption in the Kenyatta and Moi Administrations and helped Martin Shikuku come up with a Bill to fight the vice in Kenya. Like his earlier attempt to reform elections, Shikuku's bill too had no chances. As one of his last acts as Deputy Speaker, Seroney established a parliamentary committee to look into the powers and privileges of Members of Parliament. He wanted to make parliament a truly independent organ of government and MPs independent servants of the people. This again was brought to an effective end following his own detention in 1975.

Seroney initiated various development projects in his Tinderet Constituency culminating with the Samoei Institute of Technical Education (SITE) which although it was downgraded by Moi to a secondary school, it has since been elevated to the proposed Koitalel Samoei University College, a constituent college of the University of Nairobi.

Seroney's biography
A biographical book entitled Just for Today: The Life and Times of Jean-Marie Seroney by Godfrey K. Sang was launched at Jesus College, Oxford on 13 November 2015 by former Prime Minister Hon. Raila Amolo Odinga.

References

1927 births
1982 deaths
Amnesty International prisoners of conscience held by Kenya
Kenya African National Union politicians
Kenyan human rights activists
Kenyan Roman Catholics
People from Nandi County
Alumni of the University of London
Kenyan prisoners and detainees
Converts to Roman Catholicism from Anglicanism